Kim Jin-tae can refer to:

 Kim Jin-tae (actor), South Korean actor
 Kim Jin-tae (athlete) (born 1964), South Korean athlete
 Kim Jin-tae (politician) (born 1964), South Korean politician
 Kim Jin-tae (water polo) (born 1968), South Korean water polo player